The Irwin 30 Citation is an American sailboat that was designed by Ted Irwin as a cruiser and first built in 1977.

Production
The design was built by Irwin Yachts in the United States starting in 1977, but it is now out of production.

Design

The Irwin 30 Citation is a recreational keelboat, built predominantly of fiberglass, with wood trim. It has a masthead sloop rig, a raked stem, a plumb transom, a skeg-mounted rudder controlled by a wheel and a fixed shoal draft, optional deep fin keel or keel and centerboard. It displaces  and carries  of ballast.

For sailing downwind the design may be equipped with a symmetrical spinnaker.

Operational history
The boat is supported by an active class club, Irwin Yacht Owners.

See also
List of sailing boat types

References

External links

Keelboats
1970s sailboat type designs
Sailing yachts
Sailboat type designs by Ted Irwin
Sailboat types built by Irwin Yachts